The Torneo de Promoción y Reserva will be a football tournament in Peru. There are currently 19 clubs in the league. Each team will have a roster of 21-year-old players; whenever they be recorded in the club. The tournament will offer the champion two bonus points and the runner-up one bonus point to the respective regular teams in the 2023 Liga 1.

Teams

Stadia and locations

League table

Standings

Results

See also
2023 Liga 1
2023 Liga 2

References

External links
  
Tournament regulations 
Tournament fixture 
Torneo de Promoción y Reserva  news at Peru.com 
Torneo de Promoción y Reserva news at Ovacion.pe 

Res
2023